This is a list of ancient dishes, prepared foods and beverages that have been recorded as originating during ancient history. The span of recorded history is roughly 5,000 years, beginning with Sumerian cuneiform script, the oldest discovered form of coherent writing from the protoliterate period around 3,000 to 2,900 years BCE. 

Ancient history can be defined as occurring from the beginning of recorded human history to:
 The Early Middle Ages  (the end of the 4th century AD)
 The fall of the Western Roman Empire in 476 AD
 The Postclassical Era (200–600 AD and 1200–1500 AD, depending on the continent)

Although the end date of ancient history is disputed, some Western scholars use the fall of the Western Roman Empire in 476 AD (the most used), the closure of the Platonic Academy in 529 AD, the death of the emperor Justinian I in 565 AD, the birth of Islam in 610 AD or the rise of Charlemagne as the end of ancient and Classical European history. This list does not contain entries that originated after ancient history.

Archeologists and food historians have recreated some dishes using ancient recipes.

Beginning of recorded history to 476 AD
This section is limited to dishes that originated during the time of ancient history (the beginning of recorded human history) up to the Fall of the Western Roman Empire in 476 AD.

 Anfu ham is a dry-cured ham from Anfu, Jiangxi, China that originated from the Qin Dynasty. It is eaten alone and also used as an ingredient to add flavor to various dishes.
Ashishim – Israeli red lentil pancake dish of Ancient Israelite origin that was commonly eaten by Jews in antiquity.
 Babaofan or Eight Treasure Glutinous Rice was first created for a banquet celebrating King Wu of Zhou's defeat of the last King of the Shang Dynasty King Zhou of Shang in the Battle of Muye (circa 1123 BC).
 Bread – the oldest known bread is from 14,000 years ago in Jordan. 
 Flatbread
 Focaccia – dates to ancient Rome
 Mantou – dates to 307 BC – 250 BC 
 Chutney
 Congee
 Curry
 Fish sauce, see garum
 French toast, earliest reference appears in 1st century Rome
 Forcemeat
 Garum – Phoenicia, ancient Greece (where it was known as γάρος) and the Roman Empire, known from before Pompeii's destruction in 79 AD.
 Ham – dry-cured ham has been produced since ancient times.
 Hardtack – versions using various grains date back to ancient Rome, and as far back as ancient Egypt.
 Harissa – an Arab staple dish known to go back at least to the original Caliphates, and likely pre-dates Islam on the Arabian Peninsula.
 Jeok
 Jusselle
 Lamb Stew – Described in ancient Babylonian tablets from 1700 BC
 Liquamen, see garum
 Lucanica – Roman Italy, mentioned by Cicero, 1st century BC
 Maccu
 Misu karu or Misugaru
 Moretum
Nettle stew
 Noodles – existent since at least 2,000 BC in Northwest China, the noodle was developed independently in ancient China and ancient Rome, and remained common in both areas "through the centuries".
 Oatcake – known to exist at least from Roman times in Britain.
 Olive, olive oil is at least known from the Eastern Mediterranean in the Bronze Age, c. 3000 BC
 Oxygala – a dairy product in ancient Greece and Rome. It was also consumed by ancient Persians.
 Papadzules – a common dish in Maya cuisine that may be "one of the most ancient traditional dishes of Yucatán, Mexico.
 Placenta cake – a layered cake of pastry, cheese and honey originating in ancient Greece and Rome
 Rice – existed, but was "little-used in the ancient world" outside of Asia.

 Sauerkraut
 Sausage
 Scrapple – originally called "panhas", of ancient Germanic origin.
 Sop
 Soup
 Acquacotta
 Black soup
 French onion soup
 Vegetable soup
 Soy Sauce
 Tamale
 Testaroli
 Tharida
 Tofu
 Tracta was a kind of bread, pastry, or pancake in ancient Greece and perhaps Rome.
 Wonton
 Zongzi

Beverages
Beer is recorded in the written history of Mesopotamia and ancient Egypt and is one of the world's oldest prepared beverages.
 Kykeon was a common beverage of sustenance in ancient Greece, most often consisting mainly of a barley gruel mixture with various additives, sometimes written as having psychoactive properties associated with religious visions.
 Kombucha originated in what is now Northeastern China around 220 BC 
 Soy milk has been consumed in China since ancient times.
Wine consumption and production has been found through archaeological evidence as early as  BC.
Paruthi paal is an ancient authentic beverage of Indian state Tamil Nadu that is made of cotton seeds, spices, and brown country sugar

Dairy products

 Butter – documented as existent since at least 2,000 BC
 Buttermilk – existed before 1 AD in ancient India
 Kumis – documented as existing in ancient Scythia
 Milk
 Opus lactarium – documented as existing during the ancient Roman Empire
 Quark (lac concretum) – documented as existing in ancient Scythia
 Schiston – "separated milk" purported to have been invented by physicians during the time of the Ancient Roman Empire and Pliny the Elder It was prepared by boiling milk or whey along with pebbles.
 Shrikhand – documented as existing circa 800 to 300 B.C. in ancient India
 Smy – thickened milk documented as existent in ancient Egypt
 Yogurt – documented in upper Mesopotamia from the Neolithic era.

Cheeses

 Cheese – Possibly as early as 8000 BC after the domestication of the Sheep in the Fertile Crescent
 Brânză – an ancient Romanian cheese dating to "before the time of the Romans"
 Caciocavallo
Cantal – one of the oldest French cheeses, it is named after the Cantal mountain range
Emmental
 Feta – existed during the times of Homer in ancient Greece
 Touloumotiri is an ancient cheese that is considered as the "forerunner to feta".
 Kefalotyri – dates to the Byzantine Empire
 Pecorino Romano – is one of the world's most ancient cheeses
 Pecorino Sardo (Flore sardo) – one of the world's oldest cheeses that is believed to date back to the Bronze Age
 Pecorino Siciliano
 Roquefort
 Salers
 Tomme
 Tomme de Savoie

AD 477–1500
This section includes dishes, foods and beverages that originated during the time of ancient history from 477 AD to 1500 AD (prior to the Postclassical Era).
 Börek – known from 14th century Persia in a poem by Bushaq-i-Atima, although it may be far older. 
 Hummus – first mentioned in a cookbook from Cairo, Egypt from the 13th century.
 Kinilaw - raw fish marinated in citrus juices, vinegar, spices, coconut milk, and tabon-tabon fruit extracts from the Philippines. The Balangay archaeological excavation site in Butuan (dated c. 10th to 13th century AD) has uncovered remains of halved tabon-tabon fruits and fish bones cut in a manner suggesting that they were cubed, thus indicating that the cooking process is at least a thousand years old.
 Kuluban – an ancient Javanese dish of boiled vegetables served in spices, similar to modern-day urap. Mentioned in the Rukam inscription, dated to 829 Saka (907 CE) and originating from the Mataram Kingdom.
 Lalab – a similar vegetable dish called rumwah-rumwah was mentioned in the Panggumulan (Kembang Arum) inscription, dated to 824 Saka (902 AD) and originating from the Mataram Kingdom.
 Rawon – a meat stew, called rarawwan in an ancient Javanese Taji inscription (901 AD).
 Rujak – a spicy fruit dish, called rurujak in an ancient Javanese Taji inscription (901 AD).
 Krupuk – a traditional cracker made from rice flour, called kurupuk in ancient Javanese Taji inscription (901 AD).
 Popcorn – an ancient food used by people of the Inca civilization. The food is still commonly used in both regions.
 Philippine adobo – a dish and cooking process originating during the pre-colonial Philippines.
 Tapuy – rice wine originating from the pre-colonial Philippines.
 Tempeh – high-protein fermented soy product from Indonesia.  First known as kadêlê, and mentioned in an old Javanese manuscript Serat Sri Tanjung dating to the 12th to 13th century.

Lacking time frame

 Khanom chan – an ancient Thai dessert
 Poi – an ancient Polynesian staple food prepared using taro root.

Likely ancient in origin

 Nattō – prepared using fermented soybeans, nattō has been described as likely being an ancient food. Its origins have been described as unknown, and it may have been developed independently in different areas that have the same ingredients, such as Japan, China, and Korea.

 Abgoosht – also referred to as Dizi or Mesopotamian Meat Stew, was a stew originally made up of remnants of leftover vegetables and meats. 
Different areas in the world have now spun this dish into numerous different variations – including, Armenia, Iran, Azerbaijan, Afghanistan, Pakistan, India, Georgia, Iraq, Lebanon, Syria, Turkey, Russia, Bulgaria, Romania, Hungary – the dish and its origins, however, come from ancient Mesopotamia and the recipe can be dated as far back as at the very least 400 BC as it was mentioned on Cuneiform Tablets during the Babylonian period. Abgoosht and its variants with localised recipes are the national dishes of a number of countries worldwide.

See also

 Amurca
 History of cheese – the history of cheese predates recorded history
 Neolithic founder crops – eight plant species that were domesticated by early Holocene farming communities in the Fertile Crescent region of southwest Asia, and which formed the basis of systematic agriculture in the Middle East, North Africa, India, Persia and (later) Europe
 Old World wine
 Popina –  an ancient Roman wine bar, where a limited menu of simple foods (olives, bread, stews) and selection of wines of varying quality were available
 Timeline of food

Ancient cuisines
 Ancient Egyptian cuisine
 Ancient Greek cuisine
 Ancient Israelite cuisine
 Ancient Roman cuisine
 Byzantine Cuisine
 Egyptian cuisine
 Maya cuisine
 Muisca cuisine

List articles
 List of food and beverage museums
 List of foods
 List of historical cuisines
 Lists of prepared foods

Notes

References

 
Ancient
Ancient
Dishes